The  is a yakuza organization based in Fukuoka Prefecture on the Kyushu island of Japan, with an estimated 80 active members.

History
Yoshihito Tanaka (or Yoshito Tanaka) succeeded Ota in December 1991.

Condition
Headquartered in Tagawa, Fukuoka, the Taishu-kai is one of the five independent Fukuoka-based designated yakuza syndicates, along with the Kudo-kai, the Dojin-kai, the Fukuhaku-kai and the Kyushu Seido-kai.

The Taishu-kai is a member of an anti-Yamaguchi-gumi fraternal federation, the "Yonsha-kai", along with the Kitakyushu-based Kudo-kai, the Kurume-based Dojin-kai and the Kumamoto-based Kumamoto-kai.

References

Organizations established in 1954
1954 establishments in Japan
Yakuza groups based in Kyushu